Elshan Moradi Abadi (born 22 May 1985) is an Iranian-American chess grandmaster. He took part in the Chess World Cup 2011, but was eliminated in the first round by Leinier Domínguez.

When he was 16 he won the 2001 Iranian Chess Championship with a score of 10/11, ahead of Ehsan Ghaem Maghami.

He was one of the members of Iran national team in the first World Mind Sports Games held in Beijing (2008), in which the Iranian team surprisingly clinched the third place ahead of Hungary, USA and India.

In 2009 he tied for 3rd–8th with Anton Filippov, Vadim Malakhatko, Merab Gagunashvili, Alexander Shabalov and Niaz Murshed in the Ravana Challenge Tournament in Colombo.

He won the Final Four of collegiate chess with Texas Tech University in 2012. In 2015, he won the Pan-American Intercollegiate Team Chess Championship  for the first time with Texas Tech university chess team.

Moradi in February 2016, became the second Iranian chess player to reach 2600 Elo after Ehsan Ghaem Maghami, and in the following month, he scored 2603 in his own personal record. In the same year, he won the Washington International tournament ahead of Gata Kamsky and Ilya Smirin.

Moradi began representing the United States Chess Federation in February 2017.

In 2022, Moradi shared 1st place in the 122nd U.S. Chess Open with Aleksey Sorokin with a score of 8/9 but lost in tie-breaks. As Sorokin represents Russia, this qualified Moradi for the 2022 US Championship.

Education 
He has been studying in NODET Schools from 1996 until 2003. Having passed the university entrance exam in Iran, he had started to study in Sharif University of Technology. He graduated from Sharif University of Technology  with the B.Sc degree in chemical engineering.

Moradi received his MBA degree from the Rawls College of Business.

References

External links

 
 
 
 

1985 births
Living people
Iranian chess players
American chess players
Chess grandmasters
Asian Games medalists in chess
Asian Games bronze medalists for Iran
Chess players at the 2006 Asian Games
Medalists at the 2006 Asian Games
Chess players at the 2010 Asian Games
Sharif University of Technology alumni
Rawls College of Business alumni